The Embassy of the Syrian Arab Republic in Bonn is the former embassy of the country to West Germany. Its current chancery was built in 1989/90, and was the penultimate purpose built construction of an embassy in Bonn before the transfer of the German government to Berlin in 1999.

History
Syria had a diplomatic presence in Bonn at least till, 1986, when the ambassador was recalled as part of a tit-for-tat move in response to a series of diplomatic withdrawals due to the 1986 bombing of the German-Arab Friendship Society. The embassy cost  to build, and was completed shortly before the vote to move the capital to Berlin in 1991, causing disappointment. In 2017, it was announced that the premises would be sold have after spending a decade vacant, with the Syrian embassy in Berlin having finally given permission.

References

Syria
Bonn
Buildings and structures in Bonn
Germany–Syria relations